Xenomystax trucidans is an eel in the family Congridae (conger/garden eels). It was described by Alfred William Alcock in 1894. It is a marine, deep water-dwelling eel which is known from Maldives and Laccadives, in the western Indian Ocean.

Due to the limited number of specimens from which the species is known, the IUCN redlist currently lists X. trucidans as Data Deficient.

References

Congridae
Fish described in 1894